Arthur is an animated edutainment television series for children ages 4 to 8, developed by Kathy Waugh for PBS, and produced by WGBH. The show is set in the fictional U.S. city of Elwood City, and revolves around the lives of Arthur Read, an anthropomorphic aardvark, his friends and family, and their daily interactions with each other.

The television series is based on the Arthur book series written and illustrated by Marc Brown. WGBH Boston along with Montreal-based Cinar (now WildBrain) began production of the animated series in 1994, and aired its first episode on October 7, 1996. During its 25-season run, the show broadcast 253 half hour episodes.

A pilot for the spin-off series Postcards from Buster aired in December 2003 as a season 8 episode of Arthur. Postcards from Buster aired from October 11, 2004, to November 21, 2008; the series faced several years of hiatus, until a brief revival in February 2012, only to be cancelled after airing three unseen episodes that had been held over from the show's third season.

In June 2018, it was announced that Arthur was renewed for four additional seasons, through its 25th season. It was subsequently announced on July 27, 2021, that the 25th season would be the final season. Arthur concluded its original run on PBS Kids on February 21, 2022. Despite concluding after 25 years, the show will continue to have new content on PBS Kids and on the video app.

The series often deals with important issues families face such as asthma, dyslexia, cancer, diabetes, and autism spectrum disorder. It also encourages reading and relationships with family and friends by explaining that people have different personalities and interests. It was the longest-running children's animated series in the U.S., and the second longest-running animated series in the U.S., behind Fox's The Simpsons.

Setting
Arthur Read, the series' titular character, is an anthropomorphic brown aardvark who lives in the fictional town of Elwood City. He is a third-grade student at Lakewood Elementary School. Arthur's family includes two home-working parents, his father David (a chef) and his mother Jane (an accountant), his two younger sisters, Dora Winifred (D.W.), who is in preschool, and Kate, who is still an infant, and his dog Pal. Arthur also has several friends who come from diverse ethnic and socioeconomic backgrounds, and he also occasionally meets with members of his extended family.

Elwood City is portrayed as a largely suburban area which bears a strong resemblance to the Boston area; the TV series is partially produced by WGBH. There are also firm references to Brown's hometown of Erie, Pennsylvania. Most notably, the local shopping mall in the TV show is called "Mill Creek Mall", a reference to Millcreek Mall. Brown himself stated that the series is influenced by his upbringing as a child in Erie, and specifically noted that Mr. Ratburn is based on a middle-school algebra teacher he had at Westlake Middle School.

Production

Development
In 1994, Marc Brown was approached by WGBH and PBS about the possibility of adapting the Arthur books into a television series. Brown was reluctant at first to become a part of a medium for which he had little respect, but soon agreed when he learned that the objective of the television series would be to use the powerful medium of television to encourage children to read books.

Although the program was primarily written and produced by WGBH of Boston, the production of the animation and voice acting were done in Montreal, Toronto, South Korea, and Hong Kong. The animation of the show was done at AKOM Production Company from season 1 to 11, then at Animation Services (HK) Ltd from season 12 to 15. The entire cast of Arthur lives in Montreal or Toronto, where Cookie Jar Entertainment's studios are located. The only segments of the show that were filmed outside Canada were the "A Word from Us Kids" interstitials, filmed at elementary schools or other educational sites in the Boston area. Beginning in Season 11, the "A Word From Us Kids" segment was replaced by a segment called "Postcards from You", where live action videos sent in by young viewers were spotlighted per episode, and then replaced with "A Word from Us Kids" in season 12. The segments are omitted from all airings outside the US.

Marc Brown's children, Tolon, Eliza, and Tucker, are referenced in the show several times, just as they are in the Arthur book series. For example, the town's moving company is called "Tolon Moving", and everyday items such as cups or pencil sharpeners have the word "Eliza" printed on them. References to Cookie Jar Entertainment and WGBH also appear often on the show. In one episode, Francine and Buster are shown playing a table hockey game in which one team's players wear shirts in the Montreal Canadiens' signature colors with Montreal-based Cinar's logo on them (Cinar was the predecessor to Cookie Jar Entertainment) and the other team's players wear shirts in the Boston Bruins' colors with Boston-based WGBH's sting logo on them. Subsequent episodes that involve hockey also depict players wearing these sweater designs. Also, in the episode "The Big Blow-Up" in Season 2, a racecar driver wears a jersey with "Cinar" written on it and a car with "WGBH" written on it. In the episode "Prove It" in Season 4, Brain introduces D.W. to science while watching a live-action episode of Nova, a science series also produced by WGBH. Brown's son Tolon, for whom Brown first invented the character of Arthur the Aardvark in a bedtime story, was the executive director of the show.

In October 1999, Cinar was investigated for tax fraud. It was revealed that both the chairman Micheline Charest and president Ronald Weinberg invested $122 million (US) into Bahamian bank accounts without the board members' approval. Cinar had also paid American screenwriters for work while continuing to accept Canadian federal grants for content. However, Arthur itself was not involved in the scandal as it was publicly known to be co-produced with an American company. Head writers Joe Fallon and Ken Scarborough left around that time, but not because of the scandal; Fallon left about a year before the investigation began. Following the departures of Charest and Weinberg, former CBC and YTV executive Peter Moss took over Cinar, assuming Charest's former position on the show as an executive producer alongside WGBH's Carol Greenwald. By season 7, Moss had left Cinar to join Nelvana as a development executive, and financial director Andrew Porporino took his place as executive producer. He was replaced by longtime producer Lesley Taylor in season 8.

In the Season 14, the series began producing and airing episodes in 1080i HD. However, until October 15, 2012, in the U.S., the episodes still aired in 4:3 aspect ratio, with the left and right sides cropped out. They have since begun airing in 16:9 on October 15, 2012. Season 12 also marked the switching of animation studios from AKOM to ASHK. Starting with season 16, the series was produced by 9 Story Entertainment (now 9 Story Media Group) and aired in 16:9 aspect ratio. Alongside this change, 9 Story produced a re-mastered opening theme for the series in 16:9, and animation was moved in-house using Adobe Flash. Season 19 was the last season to be produced by 9 Story, with Montreal-based-Oasis Animation taking over starting in season 20.

In November 2018, Bruce Dinsmore (voice of Binky, Mr. Read, and Bailey) revealed that he has finished recording the final episodes in advance. Production of the final season was completed by the end of 2019. The series finale, "All Grown Up" featured Arthur's original voice actor, Michael Yarmush, voicing his adult self.

Music
The TV show's reggae-style theme song, "Believe in Yourself", was written by Judy Henderson and Jerry de Villiers Jr. and was performed by Ziggy Marley and the Melody Makers. A remixed techno version of the song has been officially released on the third album and a shortened version has been played during the closing credits for the sixth season. The Backstreet Boys covered the song with the original instrumentals for the ending credits of television special Arthur: It's Only Rock 'n' Roll.

The original music score was produced by Ray Fabi.

In season 2, the song "Crazy Bus", written and performed by then-head writer Joe Fallon, was introduced. It served as the alternate anthem of the television series. Cellist Yo-Yo Ma and jazz composer Joshua Redman covered the song on the ending credits of the season 4 finale episode, "My Music Rules". When Joe Fallon left Arthur after season 4, the song was officially retired from the show. The show mentions to this on the TV special Arthur: It's Only Rock 'n' Roll when D.W. says, "Crazy Bus is for babies; I know a million better songs."

Guest stars
Many celebrity guest stars have appeared on the show, each providing the voice for their anthropomorphic animal counterpart, except for Joan Rivers, who played as Francine's maternal grandmother. Lance Armstrong and Joan Rivers are the only guest stars to make more than one appearance on the series.

Cast and characters

Characters

Arthur's immediate family is the focus of the series, with most episodes involving Arthur, his younger sister D.W., their parents David and Jane, Baby Kate, and their dog, Pal. Arthur's closest friends include Buster, Francine, Muffy, Binky, Brain, and Sue Ellen, along with others such as Fern, Prunella, Jenna, and George as frequent supporting characters.

The adults in Arthur play important roles: Mr. and Mrs. Read display a significant amount of stress from parenting, Arthur's friends' parents are shown struggling in middle-class jobs, and Mr. Ratburn endures the demands and expectations of teaching elementary school. Even in difficult, adult situations, these grown ups maintain a cheerful attitude. Arthur, D.W., and Kate also visit their paternal grandmother, Thora Read, and maternal grandfather, Grandpa Dave.

Voice cast
Unlike most animated television series, Arthur showcases a wide range of voice actors. While the majority of the main supporting characters such as Jane, David, Buster, Francine and Binky have been voiced by the same set of actors since the beginning of the series, many of the young characters including Arthur, D.W., Brain, the Tibble Twins, and James have each been voiced by several actors throughout the seasons due to the producers' choice to employ young male actors for these parts.

 Arthur
 Michael Yarmush (Seasons 1–5, "All Grown Up")
 Justin Bradley (Season 6)
 Mark Rendall (Seasons 7–8, season 6 redub (U.S. only))
 Cameron Ansell (Seasons 9–11)
 Dallas Jokic (Seasons 12–15)
 Drew Adkins (Seasons 16–17)
 William Healy (Seasons 18–19)
 Jacob Ursomarzo (Seasons 20–21)
 Roman Lutterotti (Season 22–25)
 D.W. Read
 Michael Caloz (Seasons 1–3)
 Oliver Grainger (Seasons 4–6)
 Jason Szwimer (Seasons 7–10)
 Robert Naylor (Seasons 11–15)
 Jake Beale (Seasons 16–17)
 Andrew Dayton (Seasons 18–19)
 Christian Distefano (Seasons 20–21)
 Ethan Pugiotto (Season 22–25)
 Nissae Isen ("All Grown Up")
 Buster Baxter
 Daniel Brochu (as "Danny Brochu" from seasons 1–4)
 Francine
 Jodie Resther (as "Jodie Lynn Resther" from season 20–25)
 Muffy
 Melissa Altro
 Brain (Alan)
 Luke Reid (Seasons 1–4)
 Steven Crowder (Seasons 5–6)
 Alex Hood (Seasons 7–9)
 Paul-Stuart Brown (Seasons 9–11)
 Lyle O'Donohoe (Seasons 12–15)
 Siam Yu (Seasons 16–19)
 Max Friedman-Cole (Season 20–21)
 Evan Blaylock (Season 22–25)
 Binky/Mr. Read/Bailey
 Bruce Dinsmore
 Mrs. Read
 Sonja Ball
 Mr. Ratburn/Bionic Bunny
 Arthur Holden
 Grandma Thora
 Joanna Noyes
 Grandpa Dave/Mr. Crosswire
 A. J. Henderson
 Prunella
 Tamar Koslov
 Sue Ellen
 Patricia Rodriguez (Seasons 1–8)
 Jessie Kardos (Seasons 9–25)
 Tommy Tibble
 Jonathan Koensgen (Seasons 1–6)
 Aaron Grunfeld (Seasons 7–8)
 Tyler Brody-Stein (Season 9)
 Ryan Tilson (Seasons 10–11)
 Jake Roseman (Seasons 12–13)
 Jake Sim (Seasons 14–25)
 Timmy Tibble
 Ricky Mabe (Seasons 1–5)
 Samuel Holden (Seasons 6–9)
 Tyler Brody-Stein (Seasons 10–11)
 Chris Lortie (Seasons 12–13)
 Dakota Goyo (Seasons 14–15)
 Jacob Ewaniuk (Seasons 16–25)
 Emily
 Vanessa Lengies (Seasons 1–8)
 Sally Taylor-Isherwood (Season 9–25)
 Nadine
 Hayley Reynolds
 Fern
 Holly Gauthier-Frankel
 George
 Mitchell David Rothpan (Seasons 1–7)
 Evan Smirnow (Season 8)
 Eleanor Noble (Seasons 9–25)
 Ladonna
 Krystal Meadows
 Molly
 Maggie Castle
 Jenna
 Brigid Tierney
 Catherine
 Patricia Rodriguez (Seasons 1–7)
 Alexina Cowan (Seasons 8–15)
 Robyn Thaler (Season 16–25)
 James
 Nicholas Wheeler-Hughes (Seasons 1–13)
 London Angelis (Seasons 14–15)
 John Flemming (Seasons 16–17)
 Christian Distefano (Seasons 18–25)
 Bud Compson/Cisely Compson/Kara
 Julie Lemieux
Mrs. MacGrady
 Bronwen Mantel
 Rubella
 Eramelinda Boquer
 Mr. Haney/Mr. Marco
 Walter Massey
 Oliver Frensky
 Mark Camacho
 Mr. Morris
 Al Gravelle
 Mrs. Barnes
 Jane Wheeler
 Bitzi Baxter
 Ellen David
 Paige Turner
 Katie Hutchison
 Miss Woods
 Susan Glover
 Baby Kate
 Tracy Braunstein
 Pal
 Simon Peacock
 Nemo
 Greg Kramer
 Patrick
 Marcel Jeanin
 Slink/Rafi
 Michael Yarmush

Celebrity guests

 Jack Prelutsky – as himself on the episode "I'm a Poet".
 Fred Rogers – as himself in a surprise visit to Elwood City in the episode "Arthur Meets Mister Rogers".
 Art Garfunkel – as "the singing moose" in the episode "The Ballad of Buster Baxter".
 Yo-Yo Ma – as Redman's rival in "My Music Rules".
 Joshua Redman – as himself as Francine's uncle in "My Music Rules"
 Alex Trebek – as "Alex Lebek", a game show host, in "Arthur and the Big Riddle".
 Michelle Kwan – as herself, teaching Francine how to skate in "The Good Sport".
 Backstreet Boys – as themselves in the hour-long special, "Arthur - It's Only Rock 'N' Roll".
 Larry King – interviews the Arthur characters during the interstitial on PBS's telecasts.
 Tom and Ray Magliozzi – in the episode "Pick a Car, Any Car" as Click and Clack from the "Car Talk" radio show.
 Arthur Ganson – as himself in the episode "Muffy's Art Attack".
 Koko Taylor – as herself in "Big Horns George".
 Taj Mahal – as himself who helps George write music in "Big Horns George".
 Frank Gehry – as an architect who helps the gang build the new treehouse in "Castles in the Sky".
 Rodney Gilfry – as a player in the episode "Lights, Camera... Opera!"
 Johnny Damon – as a player for the Elwood City Grebes.
 Édgar Rentería – as a player in "The Curse of the Grebes".
 Mike Timlin – as a player in "The Curse of the Grebes".
 Ming Tsai – as a judge for a cooking contest at the Lakewood Elementary school in "What's Cooking?".
 Matt Damon – as himself in "The Making of Arthur".
 Lance Armstrong – as himself to help Francine deal with cancer on "The Great MacGrady". Also appears on "Binky vs. Binky" and "Room to Ride". All episodes featuring him were pulled from the air because of Armstrong's doping case, and "The Great MacGrady" was later remade with character Uncle Slam replacing him.
 Joan Rivers – as Francine's grandmother, in both season 12's "Is That Kosher?" and season 15's "Grandpa Dave's Memory Album".
 Philip Seymour Hoffman – in "No Acting Please" as Will Toffman.
 Neil Gaiman – in "Falafelosophy" as himself.
 Michael Fincke – as himself in "Buster Spaces Out;" credited as Mike Fincke.
 Alan Cumming – as Sebastian Winkleplotz in "Show Off".
 Idina Menzel – as Dr. Paula in "Shelter from the Storm".
 B. J. Novak – as Mike "MC" Cramp in "The Last Day".
 John Lewis – as himself in "Arthur Takes a Stand".
 Jane Lynch – as Mr. Ratburn's older sister Patty in "Mr. Ratburn and the Special Someone".
 R. L. Stine – as Bob Baxter in "Fright Night".
 Kevin Sampson – as himself in "George Scraps His Sculpture".
 Marc Brown – as himself in "All Grown Up".

Episodes

Each episode of Arthur ran for half an hour. Episodes consisted of two completely self-contained 11-minute stories. The episodes usually start off with one of the characters (usually Arthur) speaking towards the audience about a situation within the story followed by the title card. The episodes were separated by a one-to-two-minute live action interstitial called "And Now a Word from Us Kids" (or, in some cases, a variation of that title more specific to its contents). The live action segments almost always featured children from elementary schools (generally in the Boston area) presenting subjects they are currently learning about or projects they have been working on in their classes (the subjects covered here relate to the first cartoon segment in the half-hour). This segment was seen exclusively on PBS telecasts of the show, filling space otherwise used for commercials, which are generally forbidden on PBS. There was also a segment that sometimes appears at the end of the second 11-minute episode called "And Now a Word from Marc Brown" where he shows the viewers how to draw various main characters from the show. In 2007, the show began encouraging viewers to send in "video postcards" (similar to those used in the spin-off show Postcards from Buster), which were shown in the interstitials of episodes until the middle of Season 12. Beginning with Episode 151, the show reverted back to "And Now a Word from Us Kids".

Set in a realistic environment (as opposed to the more fantastical settings prominently featured in children's programming), certain stories (often in the second half of the episode) may not necessarily focus on the titular protagonist's point of view and may instead detail the experiences and viewpoints of surrounding characters, usually Arthur's classmates. Often such episodes covered those characters handling situations often faced by children in actuality as a means of guiding audiences through those situations, including bed-wetting, asthma, or dyslexia, and Arthur's character sometimes may see a reduced role (in some episodes, Arthur himself does not appear in the story at all). Stories in later seasons dealt with more serious issues or subjects, such as cancer, autism spectrum disorder, or even same-sex marriage, although numerous episodes simply addressed topics including childhood fears, trends, or fantasies. Occasionally, some episodes may not offer educational value. In spite of the realistically designed environment, the series showcased the fantasies or daydreams of a few characters on a number of occasions, and a few episodes feature supernatural elements such as ghosts or secret situations unknown to other characters such as Kate and Pal's friendship.

In May 2019, Alabama Public Television withheld the airing of "Mr. Ratburn and the Special Someone", where Arthur's teacher, Mr. Ratburn, married another man named Patrick. The station had also declined to broadcast a 2005 episode of the spin-off show, Postcards from Buster, where a friend had two mothers.

Franchise

Television
In addition to the television series, the Arthur franchise has spawned seven hour-long films, some of which used to be often run on PBS during pledge drives. An additional movie, Arthur's Missing Pal, was produced by Mainframe Entertainment and was the first animated Arthur project to make use of 3-D computer-generated imagery. Arthurs success has also led to the spin-off series Postcards from Buster. Postcards from Buster premiered on October 11, 2004, with several returning characters, and aired its final three episodes in 2012.

Website
The program's official website has been given a rating of 5/5 stars at website Common Sense Media, and has been advised for viewers 5 and up. The site described the show as being "one of the Internet's best offerings for kids". It also advised that "there are links to PBS sponsors but other than that, there is no commercial marketing to kids." The review added, "The games are actually teaching your kids something for example The Music Box combines music and learning, so much so that kids won't even realize that they're figuring out space relations, hand–eye coordination, and mousing skills as they jam along to upbeat tunes."

Music albums

Arthur has released three music albums. The first album, Arthur and Friends: The First Almost Real Not Live CD, contained songs that were played throughout the TV show and original songs for the album. The second album, Arthur's Perfect Christmas, contained songs that were played during the television film of the same title. The third album, Arthur's Really Rockin' Music Mix, contained only original songs, including a remix of the theme song which was played on the credits of season 6 as a promotion for the album.

ActiMates
In 1998, both Arthur and D.W. were made into Microsoft ActiMates, refined toy dolls who could interact with children, with each other, with certain computer software and the Arthur website, and also with the Arthur television show and videos.

Microsoft discontinued the ActiMates line shortly before season 5 aired, most possibly due to a lawsuit pertaining to patent infringement and the fact that sales were dropping. It has been noted that post-season 4 episodes of Arthur have not included any ActiMates code. Newer videos and DVD releases of the show does not carry ActiMates code either. The enhancements on the website were removed when the site was redesigned in 2002 and thus the ActiMates would not interact with the website. Likewise, re-releases of the ActiMates software by Creative Wonders do not interact with the ActiMates because the library that controls the PC Pack has been replaced with a dummy library file.

Video games

Home media releases
Selected episodes were distributed on VHS and DVD by Random House. Each tape had two or three episodes dealing with similar subjects. WGBH Home Video also released two Region 1 Arthur season sets; they released Season 10 on March 25, 2008, and Season 11 was released on September 2, 2008. Seasons 10–19 are available to download on the iTunes Store and Amazon.com. The first three seasons were released over four collections (the second season was split into two volumes) on DVD in Europe only.

Broadcast
Arthur became one of the highest-rated shows on PBS Kids for several years since its debut, averaging almost 10 million viewers weekly in the U.S. It is aired in a total of 83 countries, including on: PBS in the United States; Radio-Canada, Knowledge Network, TVOntario, TFO, and CBC in Canada; several ABC channels in Australia; and BBC One/CBBC/CBeebies in the UK and PBS Kids in South Africa.

Reception

Awards
The series has been acknowledged with the George Foster Peabody Award and four Daytime Emmy Awards for Outstanding Children's Animated Program. In 2002, TV Guide ranked Arthur Read No. 26 on its list of the "50 Greatest Cartoon Characters of All Time". The show has also won a BAFTA and was nominated for 17 Daytime Emmys.

Critical response
Ostrov, Gentile, and Crick (2006) write that "our viewing of many educational programs such as Arthur suggests that relational aggression is modeled at a fairly high rate. For example, children may be shown excluding and ostracizing friends or peers on the playground as part of the TV show." (p. 622). They go on to theorize that preschoolers, due to their developmental stage, may have a hard time fully understanding conflict resolution, which typically occurs at the very end of a show. Shows like Arthur typically spend most of their time building up conflicts and this may impact the type of learning that is occurring while watching shows. Moreover, they cite research suggesting that the impacts of modeling relational aggression may be especially strong for girls. This research was elaborated on in the New York Times best-selling book on parenting NurtureShock: New Thinking About Children by Bronson and Merryman (2009). Their punch line is: "Essentially, Ostrov had just found that Arthur is more dangerous for children than Power Rangers" (p. 181).

About.com gave the show a rating of 4.5 stars. The series described Arthur assets: The Arthur series has won several awards including the George Foster Peabody, and for good reason. Arthur presents issues and situations kids can relate to, and teaches positive behaviors and responses to these issues in a genuine and comical way. The series is fun and engaging to the target age group. Kids will relate to the storylines and characters, and will therefore give thought to the responses the characters demonstrate and outcome of those responses. Because "Arthur" presents real childhood issues, the show contains some imitative behavior such as name calling or bickering, much like children experience in their own lives. Kids might hear words like "sissy" or "stupid" and see Arthur and D.W. argue. Should children mimic some of these phrases or tactics, the show provides a good springboard for parents to talk about the issues with their children and point out the importance of considering others' feelings. The review continued by citing many ways in which children could extract more from the series, for example by encouraging kids to write stories based on their own families (in much the same way Arthur was first realised) or by Kim Brown, Marc Brown's sister, teaching kids to draw Arthur while on tour.

Jillian Fabiano of E! News wrote that the show's ending "has taught kindness, empathy and inclusion for 25 years."

In popular culture

Arthur regularly incorporates parodies of and references to pop culture including (but not limited to) South Park, Jeopardy!, The Waltons, Dexter's Laboratory, The Sopranos, Beavis and Butt-Head, the Indiana Jones films, the James Bond films, The Adventures of Tintin, Dr. Katz, Professional Therapist, The Jerry Springer Show, Oprah, Law & Order, Charlie Rose, Antiques Roadshow, Mystery!, The Twilight Zone, Alfred Hitchcock's The Birds, Macbeth, Planet of the Apes, The Matrix, Star Wars, Titanic, The Wizard of Oz, Jaws, That '70s Show, Harry Potter, Keeping Up with the Kardashians, This Old House, The Happy Hollisters, Percy Jackson & the Olympians, High School Musical, Pirates of the Caribbean, and The Chronicles of Narnia.

In July 2014, Chance the Rapper released his interpretation of the theme song of the series called "Wonderful Everyday: Arthur" with Wyclef Jean and Jessie Ware.

In and leading up to July 2016, Arthur regained attention from users of Black Twitter, where stills from the series have become explicit and comedic internet memes, often using an image of Arthur's clenched fist from the episode "Arthur's Big Hit". WGBH said, "We appreciate the memes that have been created and shared in good fun, we are, however, disappointed by the few that are outside of good taste." In a February 2022 interview with Yahoo! Entertainment, Marc Brown expressed his appreciation that the show has become a pop culture meme mainstay, and found it funny when celebrities like LeBron James and John Legend used memes from the show.

In July 2020, YouTuber Lilly Singh created a parody of the Arthur Theme Song called "Arthur Theme Song (2020 Version)", in which the lyrics satirise the nature of 2020.

Discography

Albums
 "The First Almost Real Not Live CD (or Tape)" (1998)
 "Arthur's Perfect Christmas" (2000)
 "Arthur's Really Rockin' Music Mix" (2001)

Singles
 "Boogie Woogie Christmas" (2000)

References

External links

 PBS Kids: Official Site
WGBH Arthur Pressroom – News and Pictures, Series Fact Sheet
Official UK CBBC site
 

 
1996 American television series debuts
2022 American television series endings
1990s American animated television series
2000s American animated television series
2010s American animated television series
2020s American animated television series
1996 Canadian television series debuts
2022 Canadian television series endings
1990s Canadian animated television series
2000s Canadian animated television series
2010s Canadian animated television series
2020s Canadian animated television series
American children's animated adventure television series
American children's animated comedy television series
American children's animated education television series
American children's animated fantasy television series
American flash animated television series
American television shows based on children's books
American television series with live action and animation
Animated television series about children
Animated television series about families
BBC children's television shows
CBC Television original programming
Canadian children's animated adventure television series
Canadian children's animated comedy television series
Canadian children's animated education television series
Canadian children's animated fantasy television series
Canadian flash animated television series
Canadian television shows based on children's books
Canadian television series with live action and animation
CBeebies
PBS Kids shows
PBS original programming
Television series by WGBH
Television shows filmed in Massachusetts
Television shows filmed in Montreal
Television shows filmed in Toronto
Ici Radio-Canada Télé original programming
Television series by 9 Story Media Group
Television series by Cookie Jar Entertainment
Television shows set in Pennsylvania
Peabody Award-winning television programs
Daytime Emmy Award for Outstanding Animated Program winners
English-language television shows
Elementary school television series